"Soundtrack 2 My Life" is a song by American recording artist Kid Cudi, taken from his debut studio album Man on the Moon: The End of Day (2009). The lyrics were written by Cudi, while the music was written by American record producer Emile Haynie. The song’s music video, directed by Jason Goldwatch, was released in 2010.

Background
On February 19, 2009, Cudi made his national television debut when he appeared on BET's 106 & Park, alongside Kanye West to debut the music video of "Day 'n' Nite". During the show, Cudi rapped a verse, a capella, which would ultimately become the first verse of "Soundtrack 2 My Life".

In a 2009 interview with DJBooth.net, Cudi explained his opening lines on the song: "I wrote that song from an ignorant standpoint, man – I wanted to have ignorance be the undertone of the whole song. And it really is to show what one thinks when his back is up against the wall. It's really to flip Jay's line and kind of use it in my favor. It worked – it's the only way I could've explained the situation."

Content
"Soundtrack 2 My Life" is the vibrant opening to Cudi's dreamland, as he raps about the work ethic of his mother, the death of his father, and the subsequent depression that came to consume him. It's a prelude of what's to come: the pain, the loss, the feelings of insignificance, and the boundless introspection. His lyrics on the track contain various musical and popular culture references, including those to the song "99 Problems", rapper Jay-Z, mentor Kanye West, the 80s sitcom Charles in Charge, the Pink Floyd album The Dark Side of the Moon, and the movie The Sixth Sense.

Critical reception
David Jeffries of AllMusic wrote, "What follow is Pink Floyd-styled story where the real world pain of ‘Soundtrack 2 My Life’ mutates into sci-fi fantasies from the dark side of the moon.

Commercial performance
Upon the release of the featuring album, "Soundtrack 2 My Life" peaked at number five on the US Billboard Bubbling Under Hot 100.

Charts

Certifications

References

Kid Cudi songs
Song recordings produced by Emile Haynie
2009 songs
Songs written by Kid Cudi
Songs written by Emile Haynie
Songs about loneliness
Songs about drugs
Music videos directed by Jason Goldwatch
Songs inspired by deaths
Songs about depression